Semenkare Nebnuni (also Nebnun and Nebnennu) is a poorly attested pharaoh of the early 13th Dynasty during the Second Intermediate Period. According to Egyptologists Darrell Baker and Kim Ryholt, Nebnuni was the ninth ruler of the 13th Dynasty. Alternatively, Jürgen von Beckerath and Detlef Franke see him as the eighth king of the dynasty.

Attestation 
Nebnuni's name is given in the Turin canon on column 7, line 11 (Gardiner col. 6, line 11). The length of Nebnuni's reign is mostly lost in a lacuna of the papyrus, except for the end "[...] and 22 days".
The only contemporary attestation of Nebnuni is a faience stele showing the king before Ptah "South of his wall", a memphite epithet of the god, and on the other before Horus, "Lord of the foreign countries".
The stele is also inscribed with Nebnuni's nomen and prenomen. The stele was discovered at Gebel el-Zeit on the Red Sea coast in the Sinai, where mines of galena were located.

Reign
The Egyptologist Kim Ryholt credits Nebnuni with a reign of two years, from 1785 BC until 1783 BC. Alternatively, Egyptologists Rolf Krauss, Detlef Franke and Thomas Schneider give Nebuni only one year of reign in 1739 BC.
Although little is known of Nebnuni's reign,  the existence of his stele shows that during this period, rulers of the 13th Dynasty still wielded sufficient power to organize mining expeditions in the Sinai for the supply of construction materials and the production of luxury items. Finally, Ryholt points to the lack of royal connections between Nebnuni and his predecessor. He thus concludes that Nebnuni may have usurped the throne.

See also
List of pharaohs

References

18th-century BC Pharaohs
Pharaohs of the Thirteenth Dynasty of Egypt